Goldsmith is an unincorporated community of Jefferson Township in Tipton County, Indiana, United States, about  north of Indianapolis.

It is part of the Kokomo, Indiana Metropolitan Statistical Area.

History
Originally called Green Station, Goldsmith was surveyed in 1876. The original landowners were John Wolford, J.A. Teter, McDonald Teter, and Hiram Fulkerson. The town's name was changed to Goldsmith after the founders discovered another town in Indiana named Green Station. It was named after a contractor who helped build the LaFayette, Muncie and Bloomington Railroad. The first home was built in the village, on the west side, by Solomon Wolford. There was also a blacksmith and a shop. A Methodist Episcopal Church was organized in Goldsmith in 1881. A church was built for the congregation, costing $1,000 to build.

A post office was established at Goldsmith in 1876, and remained in operation until it was discontinued in 2001.

As of 1914, the town was known for its high school, which was the most contemporary in the state at the time. The town used to be home to the "old settlers' meeting," in which thousands of early Indiana settlers would unite in Goldsmith to celebrate.

Geography
Goldsmith is located six miles west of Tipton, Indiana.

Demographics
As of January 1914, the village had a population of 200.

Education
The first school in Jefferson Township was built in Goldsmith and began operation in 1842. James Forsythe was the first teacher.

Notable people 

 Beryl H. Potter (1900-1985), astronomical researcher, born in Goldsmith

References

Footnotes

Sources
 Pershing, Marvin W. "History of Tipton County, Indiana: Her People, Industries and Institutions". Indianapolis: B.F. Bowen (1914).

Unincorporated communities in Tipton County, Indiana
Kokomo, Indiana metropolitan area
Unincorporated communities in Indiana